Eska Rock (often stylized as Eska ROCK) is a Polish radio channel broadcast by Grupa Radiowa Time. The station plays mainly modern rock, indie rock and alternative rock, from "classic" rock songs, to the newest "hits". It was the largest rock radio station broadcasting in Poland.

Eska Rock started broadcasting in Poznań on 22 November 2004, in Łódź and Warsaw on 5 September 2005 and in Cracow on 20 March 2006. From 2 June 2008 to 1 December 2013, Eska Rock broadcast in 18 Polish cities. On 2 December 2013, the frequencies on which Eska Rock broadcast were switched with the frequencies of another station owned by Grupa Radiowa Time, VOX FM. Since then, Eska Rock only broadcasts in Warsaw at 93.3 MHz, and has also been present online.

Eska Rock headquarters were located in Primate's Palace, Warsaw, until in 2010 the station moved to 10, Jubilerska Street in Warsaw.

FM frequencies in Poland
Frequencies on which Eska Rock broadcast from 2 June 2008 to 1 December 2013:

 Białystok – 88.6 MHz
 Gdańsk – 104.4 MHz
 Gdynia – 105.6 MHz
 Katowice – 95.5 MHz
 Kielce – 95.5 MHz
 Koszalin – 95.4 MHz
 Kraków – 107.0 MHz
 Lublin – 106.1 MHz
 Łódź – 97.9 MHz
 Olsztyn – 94.7 MHz
 Płock – 90.4 MHz
 Poznań – 107.4 MHz (local broadcast)
 Rzeszów – 97.1 MHz
 Szczecin – 95.7 MHz
 Siedlce – 91.3 MHz
 Warsaw – 104.4 MHz
 Wetlina – 87.6 MHz
 Wrocław – 101.5 MHz
 Zielona Góra – 95.3 MHz
 Kalnica – 87.6 MHz (planned)

Eska Rock staff

Management 
 Zbigniew Frączek – director of program 
 Darek Król – head of music
 Marta Niedzielska – director of promotion
 Małgorzata "Małgo" Wierzejewska – secretary of editorial staff

Producers 
 Daniel Walczak

Presenters 

 Agnieszka "Hi Szkuta" Szkuta
 Małgorzata "Małgo" Wierzejewska
 Basia "Barbra" Klaman
 Jacek Niewęgłowski
 Michał "Majkel" Cieślik
 Darek Król
 Mariusz Nałęcz-Nieniewski
 Wiktor Brzozowski
 Dawid Zygmunt

Newsreaders 
 Barbara "Barbra" Klaman
 Jacek Niewęgłowski
 Jarema Jamrożek

Past Eska Rock staff 

 Paweł Kostrzewa – director of program (2 June 2008 – 1 December 2008), host on "pROCKreacja".
 Marcin "Bisior" Bisiorek – director of program (1 December 2008 – November 2013), host on "Poduszkowiec" (Mondays, 9–11 pm) and "Gramy Co Chcemy Weekend"
 Jerzy Owsiak – host on "Dźwiękoszczelny Magazyn Jurka Owsiaka" (3 August 2008 – 4 April 2010)
 Kuba Wojewódzki – host on morning shows "Poranny WF", "Śniadanie Mistrzów" (28 January 2008 – 25 June 2012), and "Zwolnienie z WF-u" (June 2012 – December 2013)
 Michał Figurski – co-host on "Poranny WF" and "Śniadanie Mistrzów" (28 January 2008 – 25 June 2012)
 Czesław Mozil – co-host on "Zwolnienie z WF-u" (June 2012 – December 2013)
 Agnieszka Szulim – co-host on "Zwolnienie z WF-u" (June 2012 – December 2013)
 Maciej Stuhr – co-host on "Zwolnienie z WF-u" (June 2012 – 2013)
 Bartosz Węglarczyk – co-host on "Zwolnienie z WF-u" (September–November 2012)
 Jarosław "Jaro" Sobierajewicz – host on "Gramy Co Chcemy" in Poznań (local broadcast, Weekdays)
 Kamil Olszewski – executive producer and creative editor of "Zwolnienie z WF-u", host on "Poranna Rozgrzewka" (Weekdays, 6–10 am)
 Jarosław "Wendro" Wendrowski – host on "Gramy Co Chcemy" (Weekdays, 1–4 pm), "Gramy Co Chcemy Weekend"
 Idalia Tomczak – co-host on "Radar" (Weekdays, 4–7 pm)
 Konrad "Kondziu" Olszewszki – co-host on "Radar" (Weekdays, 4–7 pm), "Gramy Co Chcemy Weekend"
 Anna "Dobroć" Nowaczyk – co-host on "NRD Najlepsza Rockowa Dwudziestka" (Monday–Saturday, 7-9 pm), host on "Na Fali" (Thursdays, 9–11 pm)
 Robert ("Pegaz") Zawieja – co-host on "NRD Najlepsza Rockowa Dwudziestka" (Monday–Saturday, 7-9 pm), host on "Sanatorium" (Tuesdays, 9–11 pm)
 Radosław ("Radzio") Nałęcz – host on "Gramy Co Chcemy Weekend".
 Arkadiusz Frąckowiak – host on "Gracie Co Chcecie" (Weekdays, 11 pm–12 am)
 Mariusz "Misiek" Jankowski – host on "MiSie Podoba" (Wednesdays, 9–11 pm)

References

External links
 Official website
 Eska Rock Live Stream

Radio stations in Poland
Radio stations established in 2004